The Village School of North Bennington is an independent Pre-K to Sixth Grade school in North Bennington, Vermont. It is accredited by the New England Association of Schools and Colleges.

In 2006, it was called the North Bennington Graded School.

References

External links

Private middle schools in Vermont
Private elementary schools in Vermont
Buildings and structures in Bennington, Vermont
2013 establishments in Vermont
Educational institutions established in 2013